Joyce Beetuan Koh (born June 9, 1968) is a Singaporean composer, sound artist, and educator.

Koh's Career 
Koh studied composition at King's College London under the tutorship of David Lumsdaine. She also studied at The University of York with Nicola Lefanu, where she received her Ph.D. in 1997. Other notable events in Koh's career have included receiving a Nadia Boulanger scholarship, working alongside composer Brian Ferneyhough in 1995, and composing as a collaborationist with composers Tristan Murail in 1996 and with Hans Tutschku and Mikhail Malt in 1997–98. In subsequent years, Kho pivoted her career toward music education. Her first position in academia came in 2004, when she was offered a fellowship in residence at a small German music school, Herrenhaus Edenkoben. In 2007, Koh returned to her country of origin, Singapore, and became a founding faculty member in the music department of School of the arts, Singapore.  She also helped found the Composers' Society of Singapore, where she served as the Society President from 2013 to 2016. More recently, Koh has as Vice-Dean of interdisciplinary studies at the Nanyang Academy of Fine Arts , a position she has held from 2010 to present.

Honors 
 Koh received the Young Artist Award from the National Arts Council, Singapore, in the category of music she sang and also for her orchestra works TAI, which was  commissioned by Singapore Symphony Orchestra.

Creative work

Collaborations 
Koh's music has been performed by BBC Symphony Orchestra, Hungarian Radio Budapest Symphony Orchestra, Stavanger Symphony Orchestra, Singapore Symphony Orchestra, Résonance Contemporaine, The Song Company of Australia, Nieuw Ensemble, Take 5, and Reconsil, as well as by soloists including Prodromos Symeonidis, Frode Haltli, and Thalia Myers. Her  compositions for dance include a series of works with The Arts Fission Company, for example, ‘In the Name of Red’ (2015), a site-specific work for the inauguration festival of the National Gallery Singapore. Leaning on her concept of multimedia performance as a "theatre of music", Koh created Away We Go (2015) together with Étienne Turpin, commissioned by NTU Centre of Contemporary Art), and On the String (2010), commissioned by Singapore Arts Festival). She co-created the interactive sound installation The Canopy (2010–13), presented at World Stage Design Festival (UK 2013) and International Computer Music Conference (UK 2011). Koh collaborated with theatre director Steve Dixon on adapting T. S. Eliot's The Waste Land in a one-actor piece with video and electroacoustic sound.

Selected compositions

Orchestra 
 TAI (1997)
 Granite Harbour (1995)

Chamber music 
 Fingerprints for octet (2015)
 Piano Peals (2006)
 Edenkobener Beethoven Bagatellen (2005)
 les pierres magenta for piano and ensemble (2002)
 la pierre magenta for piano (2001)

Works for stage and dance 
 In the name of red (2015)
 The Waste Land (2013)
 Locust Wrath (2013)
 On the String (2010)
 16 Wege das Nein zu vermeiden (2005)

Multimedia 
 Shape of a City (2015)
 Hearing Lines (2013)

Discography 
 Edenkobener Beethoven Bagatellen (2005, with BeeperDesign)
 Piano Peals (2004, with ABRSM)

References

External links 

1968 births
Living people
Singaporean musicians
Singaporean composers
Dance in Singapore
Singaporean artists
Alumni of the University of York
Women composers
Women in electronic music